Tragon mimicus is a species of beetle in the family Cerambycidae. It was described by Henry Walter Bates in 1890. It is known from the Democratic Republic of the Congo, Cameroon, and Gabon.

Subspecies
 Tragon mimicus tibialis (Jordan, 1894)
 Tragon mimicus mimicus (Bates, 1890)

References

Pachystolini
Beetles described in 1890